The 2022 Premier Volleyball League Invitational Conference was the twelfth conference of the Premier Volleyball League (39th conference of the former Shakey's V-League) and its third conference as a professional league.

The tournament began on July 9, 2022. Originally slated for the July 2, the tournament was pushed back due to the requests of the club teams.

This is the first (second for the former SVL) conference of the league to commence an invitational conference. A total of eight teams will compete in this event, including one international team — KingWhale Taipei from Taiwan. The BaliPure Purest Water Defenders and F2 Logistics begged off from joining the conference. A second guest team, Kobe Shinwa University, was supposed to join the semi-final round but backed out at the last minute. Replacement guest Philippine National Team, composed mostly of NU Lady Bulldogs team members, also backed out.

Participating teams 

On August 6, the league announced that the Philippines women's national team will replace Kobe Shinwa Women's University due to COVID-19 concerns in Japan, the national team is eligible to vie for the championship.
A day after the announcement of the supposed entrance of the Philippine national team into the tournament, the team begged off due to concerns of possible injuries that the players may sustain. The final round will only consist of five teams (top 4 local clubs, 1 guest club). The team's core was composed of player and staff from the National University (NU) Lady Bulldogs. NU players and staff were released from the national team program by the Philippine National Volleyball Federation shortly after their withdrawal. The team was due to participate in the 2022 Asian Women's Volleyball Cup and the new core of the squad is planned to compose the best finishing non-guest team in the conference.

Venues
The preliminary games will start at Filoil Flying V Center, beginning the conference with live spectators. All of the elimination playdates will be held there, with the exemption of the match between Army Black Mamba and PLDT, and Creamline and Choco Mucho that will held at the SM Mall of Asia Arena, and matches between Petro Gazz and Chery Tiggo, and Cignal and Creamline that will take place in Santa Rosa Sports Complex. After the preliminaries, the semifinals will be held at Ynares Center, MOA Arena and Filoil Flying V Center, with most of the games will take place at the latter. The finals will be held at the MOA Arena.

Format 
The following format will be conducted for the entirety of the conference:
Preliminary Round
 Single-round robin preliminaries; 7 local teams; Teams are ranked using the FIVB Ranking System.
 Top four local teams will advance to the Final Round.
Final Round
 Single-round robin format; Top 4 local teams & 1 guest team; Teams are ranked using the FIVB Ranking System.
 The 3rd and 4th ranked teams will advance to the bronze medal match.
 The 1st and 2nd ranked teams will advance to the winner-take-all gold medal match.

Transactions

National team players 
The following players are part of the national team that played in the Philippine National Volleyball Federation (PNVF) International Challenge on June 11–12.

Team additions and transfers
The following are the players who transferred to another team for the upcoming conference.

Pool standing procedure 
 Number of matches won
 Match points
 Sets ratio
 Points ratio
 If the tie continues as per the point ratio between two teams, the priority will be given to the team which won the last match between them. When the tie in points ratio is between three or more teams, a new classification of these teams in the terms of points 1, 2 and 3 will be made taking into consideration only the matches in which they were opposed to each other.

Match won 3–0 or 3–1: 3 match points for the winner, 0 match points for the loser
Match won 3–2: 2 match points for the winner, 1 match point for the loser.

Preliminary round

Ranking 

 

|}

Match results 
All times are Philippine Standard Time (UTC+8:00).

|}

Final round 
 All times are Philippine Standard Time (UTC+8:00).

Semifinals

Ranking 

|}

Match results 
|}

Finals

3rd place match 
|}

Championship 
|}

Awards and medalists

Individual awards

Medalists

Final standings

2022 Asian Women's Volleyball Cup 
As announced on August 7, the Philippine National Volleyball Federation stated that the best performing local team of the invitational conference will represent the Philippines in the 2022 Asian Women's Volleyball Cup. As the semifinal round progressed, the PLDT High Speed Hitters is the first to initially accept its invitation to possibly participate on the mentioned tourney as the other top teams, Creamline and Cignal, have yet to express its interest to join.

In spite of that, Creamline will represent the country since they accepted the federation's invitation to suit up in the national team as they emerged as the champions of the invitational conference.

Statistics leaders

Preliminary round
Statistics leaders correct at the end of the preliminary round.

Final Round
Statistics leaders correct as of Day 5 (August 9, 2022) of the final round.

References 

2022 in Philippine sport
August 2022 sports events in the Philippines